Bring On the Night is a 1985 documentary film directed by Michael Apted, focusing on the jazz-inspired project and band led by the British musician Sting during the early stages of his solo career and first solo tour. Some of the songs in the film appeared on his debut solo album The Dream of the Blue Turtles. Unusually for a documentary, Apted shot the film in 35 mm, focusing primarily on band rehearsals, musician interactions, and interviews with every musician in the band. The film won the Grammy Award for "Best Music Video, Long Form" at the 1987 Grammy Awards.

Much of the film takes place inside the French Château de Courson outside of Paris, where the band met, lived and rehearsed for nine days. Near the end of the film the band plays their first concert at Théâtre Mogador in Paris. The final scene shows Sting attending his wife Trudie Styler as she gives birth to Jake, their second child and Sting's fourth. Sting said he "resisted" Apted's suggestion of filming the birth, but then he "realized there's a tenuous link between the band being born and the baby, so it fit."

The New York Times noted that Sting appeared "aloof" and "elitist" at the beginning of the film, but loosened up with his new black bandmates through a series of rehearsals. Sting's "pushy" manager Miles Copeland III is seen frequently in the film, complaining about the backing vocalists, and venting his displeasure to Colleen Atwood, the costume designer.

The film was released as DVD in 2005.

The film was named after the Police song "Bring On the Night" (1979), it is also the title of Sting's 1986 live album featuring music recorded during the 1985 tour chronicled in the film.

Cast 
Apted is heard in the film, asking interview questions, but he is not visible or credited. Seen on screen: 
 Miles Copeland III – Sting's manager
 Gil Friesen – president of A&M Records, executive producer
 Vic Garbarini – organizer of the band, A&R with A&M Records
 Omar Hakim – drummer
 Darryl Jones – bass guitarist
 Kenny Kirkland – keyboardist
 Branford Marsalis – saxophonist
 Dolette McDonald – backing vocalist
 Janice Pendarvis – backing vocalist
 Lou Salvatore – crew
 Sting – bandleader, vocalist, guitarist
 Trudie Styler – Sting's wife
 Kim Turner – Sting's right-hand man, logistics manager
 Colleen Atwood – costume designer
 Max Vadukul – portrait photographer
 Jake Sumner – Sting's newborn son

Production
 Michael Apted – director
 David Manson – producer
 Ferdinando Scarfiotti – production designer
 Ralf D. Bode – cinematographer
 Robert K. Lambert and Melvin Shapiro – editors

References

External links

1985 films
Films directed by Michael Apted
2005 video albums
Live video albums
2005 live albums
1985 documentary films
American documentary films
Sting (musician)
Grammy Award for Best Long Form Music Video
Documentary films about jazz music and musicians
Concert films
1980s English-language films
1980s American films